The Paul Bailey Pizzitola Memorial Sports Center, often referred to as "the Pitz" by students, is a 2,800-seat multi-purpose athletic center in Providence, Rhode Island, USA, which was built in 1989. It is home to the Brown University Bears men's and women's basketball, volleyball, gymnastics, wrestling and squash teams.  It was built adjacent to Meehan Auditorium on Lloyd Avenue as a replacement for Marvel Gymnasium, which was located next to Brown Stadium on Elmgrove Ave. The building was named for Paul Bailey Pizzitola (class of 1981), whose father contributed $2 million to its construction. The lobby of the building is named for the Brown attendee (1887–89) and American football legend John Heisman (class of 1891).

Gallery

See also
 List of NCAA Division I basketball arenas

References

Brown University buildings
Brown Bears men's basketball
College basketball venues in the United States
Sports venues in Rhode Island
Indoor arenas in Rhode Island
Sports venues in Providence County, Rhode Island
1989 establishments in Rhode Island
Sports venues completed in 1989
College volleyball venues in the United States
College wrestling venues in the United States
Basketball venues in Rhode Island
College gymnastics venues in the United States
Squash venues in the United States